O. R. Tambo International Airport  is an international airport serving the twin cities of Johannesburg and the main capital of South Africa, Pretoria. It is situated in Kempton Park, Gauteng. It serves as the primary airport for domestic and international travel for South Africa and since 2020, it is Africa's second busiest airport, with a capacity to handle up to 28 million passengers annually. The airport serves as the hub for South African Airways. The airport handled over 21 million passengers in 2017.

It was originally known as Jan Smuts International Airport, after the former South African Prime Minister of the same name. The airport was renamed Johannesburg International Airport in 1994 when the newly elected African National Congress (ANC) government implemented a policy of not naming airports after politicians. This policy was later reversed, and on 27 October 2006 the airport was renamed after anti-apartheid politician Oliver Reginald Tambo (1917–1993).

History
The airport was founded in 1952 as Jan Smuts International Airport, two years after Smuts's death, near the town of Kempton Park on the East Rand. It replaced Palmietfontein International Airport, which had handled European flights since 1945.

In 1943, a decision was made by the Cabinet of the Union of South Africa to construct three international airports with a Civil Airports Advisory Committee formed to investigate and report on the viability. That report was submitted to the Cabinet in March 1944 with one main international airport on the Witwatersrand and two smaller international airports at Cape Town and Durban. The South African Railways and Harbours Administration was given the role of managing the project and later in 1944, a member went to the United States to study standards and methods of construction. Four possible sites around Johannesburg were identified, with one south of Johannesburg chosen but soon discarded due to being situated on land with gold bearing reefs below. Sites were then narrowed down to Kempton Park and the existing airport at Palmietfontein.

Layouts and rough costing for the two sites were established and submitted for a ministerial decision. The site would be at Kempton Park and be named Jan Smuts Airport. The area outside Kempton Park was an expropriated undulating dairy farm of 3,706 acres with a 598 acre eucalyptus plantation. Sitting on a plateau, the area sloped away towards the east. The area was drained by the Blesbok River. The airport became operational on 1 September 1953. The new airport was officially opened by Minister for Transport, Paul Sauer on 4 October 1953 having taken eight years to build at £6.2 million. It had one main runway of 3,200m and two smaller ones of 2,514m that crossed the main with all runways being 60m wide. A 1,000 men had been employed in the repair workshops. The technical areas consisted of 2,957m of roads, 26,477sqm of concrete apron while the hangars had openings of 106m at a height of 21m. It was expecting to manage thirty flights-a-day and over 200,000 passengers that year. Airlines using the airport at its opening were BOAC, Air France, KLM, SAA, Central African Airways, Qantas, El Al, SAS Group and DETA.

In the late 1950s, jet passenger aircraft became the norm and there was a need to expand the existing ground facilities at the airport, which began in the 1960s and early-1970s. In addition to the new airside facilities, ground developments included: improved road access, parking areas, hotel, retail areas and car hire.

The late-1960s saw a new choice of aircraft for South African Airways, the Boeing 747. A decision was made by the Minister of Transport to obtain three, later five 747s for the airline. Delivery would begin in October 1971 with the first flight to London on 10 December 1971 with daily services from February 1972. These purchases however required new hangar facilities with the contract awarded in September 1969 initially worth R2,983,408. Construction started in December 1968 and was completed in October 1971 for R8,000,000 while other work at the airport associated with the arrival of these new aircraft brought the costs to R40,000,000. Other new buildings such as workshops, testing facilities, stores, staff accommodation and air cargo handling building were built. The new hangar would allow for two 747s in each bay with dimensions of 73.2 m wide, 24.4 m high and a depth of 91.4 m.

It was used as a test airport for Concorde during the 1970s, to determine how the aircraft would perform while taking off and landing at high elevations ('hot and high' testing). During the 1980s, many countries stopped trading with South Africa because of the United Nation sanctions imposed against South Africa in the struggle against apartheid, and many international airlines stopped flying to the airport. These sanctions also resulted in South African Airways being refused rights to fly over most African countries, and in addition, the risk of flying over some African countries was emphasised by the shooting down of two passenger aircraft over Rhodesia (e.g. Air Rhodesia Flight 825 and 827), forcing them to fly around the "bulge" of Africa. This required specially-modified aircraft like the long-range Boeing 747SP. A second runway was built at the airport in the late-1980s.

In December 1993, a R120,000,000 upgrade at the airport was completed. The main part of the projects was an 880 m, 3000 t steel airside corridor consisting of two levels high of 6 m wide with thirteen passenger bridges. The upper levels are connected the departure lounges through security screening points. Lower levels are for arrivals for entry into the immigration and custom areas. A future provision for extensions to this airside corridor was included in the design. A new airside bus terminal was also added for bussing in passengers to aircraft not able dock next to the terminal. Other parts of the project included upgrading the terminal facilities for the passengers.

Following the ending of apartheid, the airport's name, and that of other international airports in South Africa, were changed and these restrictions were lifted. With the creation of the Airports Company of South Africa (ACSA) in the mid-nineties, a plan to commercialise the airport began with new passenger and retail and airside facilities to handle a larger number of aircraft completing this phase in 2004.

The airport overtook Cairo International Airport in 1996 as the busiest airport in Africa and is the fourth-busiest airport in the Africa–Middle East region after Dubai International Airport, Hamad International Airport, and Abu Dhabi International Airport. In fiscal year 2010, the airport handled 8.82 million departing passengers.

In late 2005, a name change was proposed for the airport to "O. R. Tambo International", after former ANC President and anti-apartheid activist Oliver Reginald Tambo, an apparent change to the precedent of neutrally-named airports. The name change was formally announced in the Government Gazette of South Africa on 30 June 2006, allowing a 30-day window for the public to register objections. The name change was implemented on 27 October 2006 with the unveiling of new signs at the airport. Critics noted the considerable expense involved in renaming the airport, and the decision to use a politician as the name would be obscure, confusing and in some instances, offensive. Corne Mulder of the Freedom Front Plus has stamped the renaming "nothing less than political opportunism and attempts by the ANC government to dodge the true socio-economic issues of the country". Unnecessary confusion can be caused, for O. R. Tambo is also a district municipality in the Eastern Cape, seated in Mthatha. The town of Mthatha has an international airport known as Mthatha Airport, formerly named the K. D. Matanzima Airport after former Transkei President Kaiser Matanzima.

On 26 November 2006, the airport became the first in Africa to host the Airbus A380. The aircraft landed in Johannesburg on its way to Sydney via the South Pole on a test flight.

There was no provision for rapid train access until 2010, when the Gautrain project allowed train passengers to reach the airport from the Johannesburg CBD, Sandton and Pretoria.

Airport information

O. R. Tambo International Airport is a hot and high airport. Situated 1,700 metres (5,500 feet) above mean sea level, the air is thin. This is the reason for the long runways.

On 10 January 2013 the airport's ICAO code was changed from FAJS to FAOR.

South African Airways Museum 
The South African Airways Museum once was located at the airport. This room full of South African Airways memorabilia was started by two fans of the airline as a temporary location until they could set it up in one of Jan Smuts International's buildings in 1987. The museum has since relocated to Rand Airport (FAGM).

Aircraft viewing decks 
The airport has two viewing decks. One is located above the Central Terminal Building, and the other in an administrative section of the airport above the international check-in counters. There are regular displays of Oliver Reginald Tambo, the airport's namesake in the viewing decks.

Infrastructure

Runways
O. R. Tambo International Airport has two runways (one pair of parallel runways) adjacent to the airport's terminal buildings. There used to be a third runway, 09/27, but was closed due to the danger it posed. It is now taxiway Juliet. Another decommissioned runway includes runway 14/32, crossing runway 03L/21R and 03R/21L, which has since converted into taxiway Echo.

The runways are equipped with approach lighting systems. Sequenced flashers are not used at any South African runways and therefore not installed. Touchdown zone (TDZ) lighting is available, but never turned on. Runway Threshold, Edge and Centerline lights are the only lighting available. During busy periods, outbound flights use the western runway (03L/21R) for take-off, while inbound flights use the eastern runway (03R/21L) for landing. Wind factors may cause numerous variations, but on most days flights will take off to the north and land from the south.

Taxiways and aprons 
O. R. Tambo International Airport has a network of asphalt taxiways connecting runways, aprons and maintenance facilities. All of these taxiways are 30.5 metres wide, except for taxiway Echo and Juliet which is 60 metres wide, as it was formerly runway 14/32 and 09/27, respectively. The airport also has nine aprons. Cargo aircraft park at aprons Golf and Whiskey. Many airlines have their aircraft wait long hours between arriving and departing flights. Such aircraft and other cargo aircraft are parked at aprons Delta and Foxtrot to free up jetbridges. Aprons Alpha, Charlie and Echo have jetbridges that connect them to their respective gates. The Bravo apron is not connected to the terminal building, and thus aircraft that land there must use an airport bus service.

Developments
ACSA reported that major new developments took place at the airport, in preparation for the 2010 FIFA World Cup.
The development includes expansion of the international terminal, with the new international pier (opened in 2009), which includes gates for the Airbus A380 and increased capacity at the same time.
A new Central Terminal building, designed by Osmond Lange Architects and Planners, was completed on 1 April 2009.  An additional multi-storey parkade was built in January 2010, at a cost of R470 million opposite the Central Terminal Building,  plus Terminal A was also upgraded and the associated roadways realigned to accommodate more International Departures space.

The Central Terminal Building (CTB) (cost: R2 billion) boosted passenger capacity at the landside of the terminal in 3 levels, and allows direct access from international and domestic terminals. Additional luggage carousels were added on 12 March 2010 to accommodate the Airbus A380.  Arrivals are accommodated on Level 1, with departures expanded on Level 3; Level 2 accommodates further retail and commercial activities. The Gautrain Rapid Rail Link station is above the terminal.

The new International Pier (cost: R535 million) has increased international arrivals and departures capacity in a two-storey structure with nine additional airside contact stands, four of which are Airbus A380 compatible.  Air bridges are already in place and the existing duty-free mall will be extended into this area. Additional lounges and passenger-holding areas will be constructed on the upper level.

A second terminal between the two runways has been cancelled. It would have contained its own domestic and international check-in facilities, contact stands, shops and lounges and was projected to cost R8 billion.

Terminals
There are six terminals at the airport, but these can be broken down into three major areas: the international terminals; the domestic terminals; and the transit terminals. The transit terminal housed disused parts of the old domestic terminals. It has been mostly demolished to build a new Central Terminal that will provide an indoor link between domestic and international terminals, as well as a central passenger check-in area and more gates. It was constructed for the 2010 FIFA World Cup. Terminals A1 and A2 handle international passengers while the other two terminals handle domestic passengers. Due to the airport's design, departure and arrivals terminals are considered separate terminals. The Central Terminal that is under construction will be named Terminal A3 and it will be used for both international and domestic passengers. 
The two terminals, Terminal A and Terminal B have been restructured. Several airlines now use Terminal B for all check-ins (top floor, adjacent to the arrivals atrium), for both national and international flights. The airlines that use Terminal B include Air Cote D'Ivoire, RwandAir, South African Airways, Airlink, Lift-Airline, FlySafair, KLM, Air France, Ethiopian Airlines, Qantas and Air Mauritius.

Terminals A and B boast over 140 retail stores. The Duty-Free stores are based airside in Terminal A and many of them stock products exclusively available at the airport.

The ample parking available at O. R. Tambo International Airport was revamped as part of the upgrades made prior to the 2010 World Cup with the introduction of state-of-the-art technology that allows visitors to identify available parking spaces easily.

Airlines and destinations

Passenger

Notes
 : This flight operates via Walvis Bay. However, this carrier does not have rights to transport passengers solely between Walvis Bay and Saint Helena.
 : This flight operates via Saint Helena.
 : This flight operates via Douala or Libreville.
 : This flight operates via Douala and Lagos.
 : This flight operates via Lubumbashi.
 : This flight operates via Beira.
 : Some flights operate via Maputo.
 : This flight operates via Blantyre.
 : Two flights originate from Durban and Gaborone respectively. However, this carrier does not have rights to transport passengers solely between Johannesburg and Durban/Gaborone.
 : This flight operates via Lusaka.
 : Two flights originate from Maputo and Durban respectively. However, this carrier does not have rights to transport passengers solely between Johannesburg and Maputo/Durban.
 : This flight operates between Singapore and Cape Town with a stopover at Johannesburg. However, this carrier does not have rights to transport passengers solely between Johannesburg and Cape Town.
: One of two of these flights from Atlanta continues on to Cape Town. However, this carrier does not have rights to transport passengers solely between Johannesburg and Cape Town.

Cargo

Traffic and statistics
O. R. Tambo International Airport recorded 21.2 million passengers in 2017–2018, up from 20.7 million passengers the year before. Of those passengers, 9.2 million were international and 11 million domestic, with the remainder being classified as "regional" or "unscheduled". 220,644 aircraft traffic movements were recorded; the majority being domestic services. O. R. Tambo International Airport is the busiest airport in South Africa.

Passenger traffic

Aircraft movements

Other buildings

South African Airways is headquartered in Airways Park on the grounds of O. R. Tambo International Airport. The building was developed by Stauch Vorster Architects. Airways Park was completed in March 1997 for R70 Million ($17.5 Million). The fourth floor of the West Wing of the Pier Development of O. R. Tambo was also the head office of South African Express until it ceased operating in 2020.

Ground transport

Rail transit
A transit terminal has been built between the domestic and international terminals. It houses the Gautrain station linking the airport to Sandton, a major business district and a primary tourist area, and, from there, the rest of the Gautrain system.

In September 2006 Gauteng Province contracted Bombardier Transportation for a rail link connecting Johannesburg, Pretoria, and the airport, with construction to begin immediately. The section linking the airport to Sandton in Johannesburg was completed on 8 June 2010 in time for the World Cup. Trains run 90 trips per day and carry an estimated 60000 passengers daily.

Car
The airport is easily accessible by car and it is located northeast of Johannesburg Central at the eastern end of the R24 Airport Freeway. It can be accessed by the R24 Airport Freeway (also known as the Albertina Sisulu Freeway) from Johannesburg Central and the R21 highway from Pretoria and the central part of the East Rand. The R24 intersects with the R21 near the airport and with the O. R. Tambo Airport Highway. This highway goes through the airport terminals, separating them from the parking bays, but it branches off into two directions: "departures" and "arrivals", and then it re-branches into the intersection.

Bus
Five bus city lines, operated by Metrobus and Putco, pass through the airport twice a day. The buses are accessible in the morning and the evening, when there are many passengers departing and arriving. There are also private bus lines operating express buses to the CBD of Johannesburg, as well as other locations.

Accidents and incidents
 20 October 1957 – A Vickers Viscount G-AOYF, operated by Vickers on a test flight, was damaged beyond economic repair when the starboard undercarriage collapsed following a heavy landing.
 1 March 1988 – A Comair Embraer EMB 110 Bandeirante ZS-LGP, exploded in mid-air whilst on final approach. All seventeen occupants were killed. A passenger was suspected of detonating an explosive device but to this day it has never been proven.
 22 April 1999 – A Boeing 727 ZS-IJE was damaged beyond repair by large hailstones while on approach for landing. The aircraft landed safely with no loss of life.
 3 November 2001 – A Reims-Cessna F406 crashed shortly after takeoff from runway 03R, killing all 3 occupants. The aircraft did not have a valid certificate of airworthiness at the time of the incident.
 9 April 2004 – An Emirates Airbus A340-300 A6-ERN operating flight EK764 from Johannesburg to Dubai sustained serious damage during takeoff when it failed to become airborne before the end of the runway, striking 25 approach lights, causing four tyres to burst which in turn threw debris into various parts of the aircraft, ultimately damaging the flap drive mechanism. This rendered the flaps immoveable in the takeoff position. The aircraft returned for an emergency landing during which the normal braking system failed as a result of the damage. The aircraft was brought to a stop only 250 metres from the end of the 3,400-metre runway using reverse thrust and the alternate braking system. In their report, South African investigators found that the captain had used an erroneous take-off technique, and criticised Emirates training and rostering practices.
 22 December 2013 – A British Airways Boeing 747-400 G-BNLL operating flight BA33 collided with a building at the airport. Four ground-handling staff in the building sustained minor injuries. The airplane was written off and scrapped by April 2015.
 26 October 2015 – A British Airways operated by Comair Boeing 737-400 ZS-OAA operating flight BA6234 from Port Elizabeth suffered a gear collapse while landing at the airport. There were no injuries.
 12 November 2022 - A South African Airways Airbus A320 (ZS-SZJ) being towed collided with a parked FlySafair Boeing 737-8BG (ZS-SJH) at O. R. Tambo International Airport. No passengers were onboard either aircraft at the time. The FlySafair’s empennage section and SAA wing tip were damaged. As a result, both aircraft were rendered inoperable.

See also
 List of airports in South Africa
 List of South African airports by passenger movements

References

External links
 
 

1952 establishments in South Africa
Airports in Johannesburg
Airports in South Africa
Airports established in 1952
Kempton Park, Gauteng
Buildings and structures in Gauteng